Tiffany Memorandum (also known as The Tiffany Memorandum) is a 1967 Eurospy film directed by Sergio Grieco. It is an international co-production between Italy, France (where the film is known as Coup de force à Berlin) and West Germany (where it  was released as Komm Gorilla, schlag zu!). The film is set in Berlin.

Cast 

 Ken Clark: Dick Hallam
 Irina Demick: Sylvie Meynard
 Luigi Vannucchi: Inspector Brook 
 Loredana Nusciak: Madame Tiffany
 Grégoire Aslan:  	The Shadow 
 Jacques Berthier:  Colonel Callaghan 
 Carlo Hintermann: Shadow's Agent
 Michel Bardinet: Francisco Aguirre
 Angelo Infanti: Pablo Almereyda / Max Schultz
 Solvi Stubing: Hotel Maid
 Giampiero Albertini: Callaghan's Agent / Doctor

References

External links

1967 films
1960s action thriller films
1960s spy thriller films
Italian action thriller films
Italian spy thriller films
French spy thriller films
West German films
Films directed by Sergio Grieco
Films set in Berlin
Films scored by Riz Ortolani
1960s Italian-language films
1960s Italian films